Madison Township is one of thirteen townships in St. Joseph County, in the U.S. state of Indiana. As of the 2000 census, its population was 1,770.

Geography

Unincorporated towns
 Woodland at 
 Wyatt at 
(This list is based on USGS data and may include former settlements.)

Adjacent townships
 Penn Township (north)
 Olive Township, Elkhart County (east)
 Locke Township, Elkhart County (southeast)
 German Township, Marshall County (south)
 Union Township (west)
 Centre Township (northwest)

Cemeteries
The township contains Resthaven Cemetery, the St. Paul Lutheran Church (LCMS) cemetery, and the St. John's Church (UCC) cemetery.

Major highways

School districts
 Penn-Harris-Madison School Corporation

Political districts
 Indiana's 2nd congressional district
 State House District 21
 State Senate District 9

References

 United States Census Bureau 2008 TIGER/Line Shapefiles
 United States Board on Geographic Names (GNIS)
 IndianaMap

External links
 Indiana Township Association
 United Township Association of Indiana

Townships in St. Joseph County, Indiana
South Bend – Mishawaka metropolitan area
Townships in Indiana